The Firm is Malaysia's first corporate reality television programme produced by Popiah Pictures and ntv7. Hosted by Peter Pek and Chan Boon Yong, the show is directed by award-winning director Ng Ping Ho of Kopitiam fame. In The Firm, a group of professionals compete in an elimination-style competition to find the next corporate high-flyer.

The show attempts to separate the weak from the strong, the under-achievers from the over-achievers and the followers from the leaders. Each week, candidates compete in a series of tasks dealing with different disciplines in business that is imperative to the success of a corporate high-flier. Amongst others, these include branding, promotions, positioning and catering to target markets. The catch phrase used in the show is "You're terminated". The show premièred prime time on ntv7 and Astro channel 7 on 24 June 2007.

Although the show initially drew comparisons to Mark Burnett's The Apprentice, it became quite apparent that it is quite different in that there are two corporate leaders who lead each team and decide who gets eliminated when their team fails to win a challenge. In addition, in episode 7, both corporate leaders leave their jobs as mentors to the teams and a new CEO enters the picture.

The Firm has reached its second season, which premièred on ntv7 and Astro 107 on 2 August 2008.

Hosts/Judges
The Firm has two corporate leaders, and a CEO, who all judge the candidates at different stages:
 Peter Pek: renowned brand guru, writer, columnist, editor, publisher, designer, creative director, public speaker, and head of Malaysia's largest branding agency, Mercatus+.
 Chan Boon Yong: entrepreneur and founder of The Carat Club, a diamond retailer.
 Tengku Zafrul Aziz: CEO of CIMB Investment Banking.

History

Season 1

Season one of the Firm premiered on Malaysian television on 24 June 2007, featuring ten aspiring entrepreneurs divided into two teams, Dynamic and Momentum, led by Pek and Chan respectively, vying for a top position in "the Firm", which turned out to be a job offer in Tune Money, among other prizes. Tengku Zafrul's identity remained undisclosed for the earlier half of the season until the remaining contestants merge in the run-up to the finale. The grand prize fell in the hands of Joel Neoh Eu-Jin, who is now known for pioneering "youth entrepreneurship".

Season 2

Season two premiered on 2 August 2008, in which fourteen aspiring entrepreneurs vie for the position of Assistant CEO in "The Firm", again divided into two teams – Equity and Asset, led by Pek and Chan respectively. The line up of contestants were:

1) Toh Joo Lee

2) Terrence Lee

3) Choi Kian You

4) Dian Azmi

5) Ain

6) Yuen Wai

7) Salasiah Abbas

8) Chris Lo

9) Boon Yew

10) Jennifer Eu 

11) Masami

12) Anoop

13) CA

14) Ridzuan

Azti Dian Fitri Azmi, a 31-year-old publications manager emerged the winner. She took home a cash prize worth $100,000 and a job contract to work for Tune Money.

References
 Taib, Shuib (28 June 2007). Looking for the head honcho. New Straits Times. Retrieved 1 July 2007.
 Chandran, Sheela (27 June 2007). You’re fired! – Watch how 10 contestants battle to scale the corporate ladder in Ntv7’s The Firm. The Star. Retrieved 27 June 2007.
 Zaidi Isham Ismail (19 June 2007). ntv7 sees 600,000 viewers tuning in to 'The Firm'. Business Times. Retrieved 20 June 2007.
 Sharifah Arfah (21 June 2007). Weekend Watch: Run-up to Merdeka. The New Straits Times Online. Retrieved 24 June 2007.
 Sheela Chandran (27 August 2007). Victorious Joel. The Star. Retrieved 27 August 2007.

External links
 
 ntv7's The Firm microsite
 The Firm preview on YouTube
 Discussion on every episode of The Firm

2007 Malaysian television series debuts
Malaysian reality television series
NTV7 original programming